The New Hampshire at-large congressional district is obsolete, with representation having since been divided into districts.

However, from 1789 to 1847, New Hampshire elected members to the United States House of Representatives at-large:
From 1789 to 1793, three members represented the state at-large.
From 1793 to 1803, four members represented the state at-large.
From 1803 to 1813, five members represented the state at-large.
From 1813 to 1833, six members represented the state at-large.
From 1833 to 1843, five members represented the state at-large.
From 1843 to 1847, four members represented the state at-large.
In 1847 at-large representation was replaced by four congressional districts.

List of members representing the district

Notes

References

 Congressional Biographical Directory of the United States 1774–present
 

At-large
At-large United States congressional districts
Former congressional districts of the United States
1789 establishments in New Hampshire